WVVO (1140 AM) is a radio station broadcasting a Salsa Music format. It is licensed to Orlando, Florida, and is owned by Florida Broadcasters. It addition to its AM signal, WVVO is heard on three FM translators in the Greater Orlando area: 99.5 W258DD in Orlando, 103.5 W278CN in Eatonville, and 103.7 W279DI in Kissimmee.

WVVO was originally licensed as a "daytime only" station. AM 1140 is a clear channel frequency reserved for Class A WRVA in Richmond, Virginia, and WVVO had to sign off at sunset to avoid interference. Now, WVVO broadcasts at night with an FCC approved power of only 8 watts. By day, WVVO is powered at 5,000 watts.

On December 15, 2017, the station flipped from its gospel programming to a reggaetón format. On January 3, 2018, it changed its call sign from WRMQ to WURF, then to WURB on June 19, 2019, and as of December 31, 2021, carries the callsign WVVO. It has since flipped to the salsa format previously carried by sister station WONQ. The reggaetón format moved back to WURB-LP.

External links
 
 
 
 
 
 
 

VVO
1986 establishments in Florida
Radio stations established in 1986
VVO